Rahne is both a surname and a given name. Notable people with the name include: 

Ricky Rahne (born 1980), American football player and coach
Rahne Jones (born 1987), American actress

See also
Rahner